The Virgin Orans, Oranta (The Great Panagia) is a well-known Orthodox Christian depiction of the Virgin Mary in prayer with extended arms. It is stored in the Saint Sophia Cathedral in Kyiv in Ukraine. The 6-meter-high mosaic is located in the vault of the chancel. The icon has been present in the cathedral since its foundation by Yaroslav I the Wise in the 11th century.

The Virgin's solemn and static posture, the characteristic folds of her garments, and her pensive expression indicate the design was strongly influenced by Byzantine art.

The image is considered one of the greatest sacred symbols in Ukraine, a palladion defending the people of the country. It has been called an "Indestructible Wall" or "Unmoveable Wall". Legend says that as long as the Theotokos is extending Her arms over Kyiv, the city will stand indestructible. 

The embroidered handkerchief on the belt of the Mother of God is popularly thought to be for wiping away the tears of those who come before her with their problems and concerns.

In 1997, the National Bank of Ukraine issued commemorative coins "Orante" ("Oranta") within the "Spiritual Treasures of Ukraine" series.

See also
 Orans

References

Eastern Orthodox icons of the Virgin Mary
Virgin Mary in art
Ukrainian icons